Alexandra Diplarou (born December 8, 1981 in Greece) is a Greek female retired professional volleyball player, who played for Greek powerhouse Olympiacos Piraeus. She was a member of the club for 5 years (2000–2005). Diplarou played the opposite hitter position.

References

1981 births
Living people
Olympiacos Women's Volleyball players
Greek women's volleyball players
21st-century Greek women